KCNP (89.5 FM) is a radio station licensed to Ada, Oklahoma, United States. The station is currently owned by the Chickasaw Nation.

The Chickasaw Nation owns three additional transmitters that simulcast KCNP – KAZC 89.3 in Dickson, KTNG 97.3 in Connerville, and KWPV 104.5 in Wynnewood.

Repeaters

History
The station was assigned the call letters KTGS on August 14, 1998. On September 24, 2008, the station changed its call sign to the current KCNP.

See also
List of community radio stations in the United States

References

External links
 
 

Native American radio
CNP
Chickasaw
Radio stations established in 1998
Ada, Oklahoma
Community radio stations in the United States